Haliotinella is a genus of predatory sea snails, marine gastropod mollusks in the subfamily [unassigned] Naticidae of the family Naticidae, the moon snails.

Species
Species within the genus Haliotinella include:
 Haliotinella montrouzieri Souverbie, 1875
 Haliotinella patinaria Guppy, 1876

References

External links
 Souverbie [S.-M. & Montrouzier [X.]. (1875). Descriptions d'espèces nouvelles de l'archipel calédonien. Journal de Conchyliologie. 23(1): 33-44, pl. 4]

Naticidae